The 1935–36 season was Port Vale's 30th season of football in the English Football League, and their sixth successive season (29th overall) in the Second Division. The club suffered the second relegation of its history. This occurred primarily through a still-standing club record 106 goals conceded in 42 league matches, as well as through away form that saw the team pick up just five points on their travels, and a streak of twelve defeats in sixteen games from September to January. Finishing with a tally of 32 points, they were just two points shy of safety. The club would have to wait until 1954–55 before playing another season of second tier football. Despite this, one positive of the season was an historic win over Football League champions Sunderland in the FA Cup.

Overview

Second Division
The pre-season began with the sale of top-scorer Tom Nolan to Bradford Park Avenue, whilst manager Tom Holford heralded a youth policy. Ten new faces replaced the fourteen retained from the previous season, these included: free-scoring striker George Stabb (Notts County), centre-half Harry Griffiths (Everton), left-winger Arthur Caldwell (Winsford United), left-back Roderick Welsh (Portsmouth), and right-half Michael Curley (Manchester City).

The season started with what would ultimately turn out to be a relegation decider, Vale lost 4–2 to Barnsley at Oakwell, with the "Tykes" scoring twice in the last ten minutes. Still switching the team regularly to find a favourite eleven, the "Valiants" then picked up eight points from their next six games to move into eighth in the table. This run included wins over Plymouth Argyle, Charlton Athletic and Newcastle United at The Old Recreation Ground. On 28 September, the defence was ripped apart with a 5–2 defeat to Tottenham Hotspur at White Hart Lane. A further four defeats and thirteen goals conceded followed, resulting in manager Tom Holford being relieved of his management duties to revert to a scouting role. Relief for Vale came on 2 November, with a hard-pushed 3–2 win over Bradford Park Avenue.

Vale's poor form continued with a run of five defeats and two draws in seven games. In November Fred Mitcheson was sold to Plymouth to raise funds for new players. George Heywood was promptly signed from Altrincham for £250. Heywood made his debut on 23 November, as Vale suffered a 9–2 demolition at the City Ground to Nottingham Forest. Forest were only kept from double figures by 'many fine saves' from Potts. On 7 December, a 2–0 loss at Belle Vue from Doncaster Rovers sent Vale to the foot of the table. As a result of this, the club put in a large bid for Wigan Athletic's Jack Roberts, and consequently signed the highly promising forward. Meanwhile, injuries and constant rotation of the first eleven worked against the team. A 4–0 defeat from West Ham United at Upton Park on 21 December was followed by the club's first away win in sixteen attempts five days later. The win came over a poor Hull City side in ankle deep mud. Two days later and Barnsley beat Vale 4–0 at "The Rec", which would again have fatal consequences come May.

Following up on their FA Cup heroics, the Vale recorded a 2–1 victory over Bradford City on 18 January. They then lost 5–1 at home to "Spurs", earned a point at St James' Park, and then were humiliated 7–2 at Old Trafford. Three home wins followed, the last of which was a 4–0 win over doomed Hull City in front of a mere 2,669 supporters. This took them out of the relegation zone. However, on 27 March an extraordinary shareholders meeting was called at the Grand Hotel (Hanley), in which the net weekly income was revealed to be just £181. The directors claimed they were no longer prepared to prop the club up financially, and demanded the supporters raise £2,000 to keep the club afloat. A subsequent public meeting launched a 40,000 Shilling Fund, and a benefit match with cross-city rivals Stoke City raised £528 – helping to ensure the survival of Port Vale.

Two points clear of relegation on 4 April despite losing 5–0 at Bury, it was expected that Vale would be safe. A win over Fulham and a draw with Sheffield United reinforced such expectations. However, on 13 April, they travelled to Craven Cottage, where they were beaten 7–0. Two further defeats meant victory on the final day encounter with Charlton Athletic at The Valley was needed – the "Addicks" needed a point themselves to ensure promotion. 27,778 spectators witnessed Charlton take the lead, a lead wiped out by a Caldwell equalizer on 83 minutes. The team's valiant efforts were futile in any case, as other results went against them.

They finished in 21st place with 32 points. Their 106 goals conceded gave them the fourth worst defensive record in the Football League. Jack Roberts' twelve goals in 21 games were impressive, but not enough to help the club beyond a tally of 56 goals scored.

Finances
On the financial side, a loss of £1,046 was made on the season. Income was supplemented by the £1,800 raised from the Shilling Fund. Gross gate receipts were down to just £9,226, whilst a strict control over wages saw a wage bill of just £6,937. The transfer credit stood at £1,640. Fifteen players were released, the most significant of which were George Shenton, John Potts, Jack Vickers, and James Baker.

Cup competitions
In contrast to their league form, Vale performed well in the FA Cup. Pitted against eventual First Division champions Sunderland at Roker Park, their top player Roberts cup-tied, a heavy defeat seemed likely. Instead an 88th-minute equalizer from Caldwell forced a replay. The highest crowd of the season then witnessed a 2–0 victory at the "Rec", which the "Valiants" "defended brilliantly". The Sentinel'''s Placer suggested it to be 'the greatest victory in the history of the club'. In the Fourth Round, First Division Grimsby Town would advance with a 4–0 victory in the snow. Before the match the teams paid their respects to the recently deceased George V with Abide with Me, during which the "Mariners" wore overcoats as the Vale players shivered – this was the excuse used to justify their conceding four first half goals.

League table

ResultsPort Vale's score comes first''

Football League Second Division

Results by matchday

Matches

FA Cup

Player statistics

Appearances

Top scorers

Transfers

Transfers in

Transfers out

References
Specific

General

Port Vale F.C. seasons
Port Vale